Toruń Fortress is a historic fortress located in Toruń, Poland, one of the largest fortresses in Central and Eastern Europe.

It was built in 1872–1894 by the Kingdom of Prussia, when the city was part of the Prussian Partition of Poland. The fortress complex – a chain of forts surrounding the city, as well as numerous smaller fortifications supplementing it – was intended to defend the eastern border of Prussia (with the Russian Empire). Despite much planning and investment, the fortress did not play a significant role in the First World War nor in any later conflict. During the German occupation of Poland in the Second World War, Germany established and operated a prison for Poles and the Stalag XX-A prisoner-of-war camp for Polish, British, French, Australian and Soviet POWs in the fortress. It was the site of German massacres of Poles committed as part of the Intelligenzaktion.

History

Toruń was an important city, which following the Partitions of Poland was located just north and west of the border between Prussia and Russia, which runs from southwest to northeast, in the north along the Drwęca tributary of the Vistula River which passes through Thorn. With improvements in artillery techniques, including the introduction of rifled barrels and smokeless powder), the old medieval city walls, dating from the 13th-15th centuries, and bastion fortifications from the 17th century, even if modernized at the beginning of the 19th century, no longer provided sufficient protection for the town.

The Prussian government started the construction of fortifications in 1872, at first using French prisoners of war taken during the Franco-Prussian War. The goal was to build a chain of forts surrounding the city of Toruń. The initial plans called for five main forts and two medium ones to be constructed. In the period of 1877–1884, forts II and XI were constructed, followed by forts IV, V, VII, XV, XIII and IX. Continuing changes in artillery and siege techniques, especially the introduction of an anti-building shell in 1883, rendered some of the plans for the fortress obsolete even before it was finished. For that reason, the importance of the main artillery forts was lessened in favor of infantry forts; some artillery forts were redesigned into infantry forts and more small fortifications were constructed. Over time the number of objects to be built increased. In the years 1888–1893, forts III, VI, VIII, X, XII and XIV were added. The last to be constructed was fort I, which was the most technically advanced one. Within 32 years, about 200 fortifications were constructed. Primarily the fortress consisted of seven main forts, six medium-sized ones, six artillery batteries, 32 infantry shelters, and 52 mid-field shelters (used for artillery and ammunition sheltering).

The Toruń Fortress complex would be constantly modernised by the Prussian government, for the last time in 1914 – just before the start of the First World War. The majority of the forts were equipped with wing artillery batteries – armor artillery batteries between forts XI, XII, XII and XII, XIII, XIV, and an experimental artillery battery in fort XI. New observation points for infantry and artillery were also added. Exits from them were designed in a labyrinthine scheme, to reduce the effects of the explosions' blast waves.

The fortress was commissioned by the Prussian government; it would cost over 60 million German gold marks until 1914. About 30% of Toruń's infrastructure was related to the fortress, and about 25% of the city's population were employed by the fortress. Despite that investment, it was never besieged by Russian forces and took no significant part in the First World War. After the war it became a part of the Second Polish Republic.

During the German occupation of Poland (Second World War), from October 1939, Fort VII housed a German police prison for Poles arrested in the city and county in the Intelligenzaktion. In the overcrowded prison, the Germans interrogated the Poles, who were then either deported to concentration camps or murdered in large massacres carried out in nearby forests. Among the victims were local activists, teachers, priests, and farmers. In the spring of 1942, the Germans murdered 30 Polish boy scouts aged 13–16 in Fort VII. In the seven southern forts (XI-XVII), the Germans operated the Stalag XX-A prisoner-of-war camp for Polish, British, French, Australian and Soviet POWs.

In 1971 the fortress was officially declared a monument by the Polish government.

The complex
The Thorn Fortress complex is currently composed of 15 forts (seven artillery and eight infantry) as well as many smaller fortifications.

References

External links

 15 forts as seen from satellite (Google Earth)
  Photos
 Twierdza Toruń / Festung Thorn on the pages of historical department of University of Toruń
  At Toruń's Fortification Friends page:
List of fortress elements with modern photos
Maps
Modern photos
Vintage photos
On postcards
 Stalag 20A Thorn on the map
  Heritage Fortress Park AB IV Battery / Skansen Fortyfikacji Pancernej Twierdzy Toruń

Forts in Poland
Buildings and structures in Toruń